Le Havre Normandy University (French: Université Le Havre Normandie) is a French university located in Le Havre. Along with five other schools, Le Havre Normandy University is a member of Normandy University, an association of universities and higher education institutions.

Identity in Normandy 

Le Havre Normandy University (Université Le Havre Normandie) is a French university in the Academy of Rouen, co-founder in 2015 of ComUE Normandy University

It takes part in the XL-Chem Graduate School of Research project, funded by the State via the National Research Agency.

Digital Campus / Network Unesco 

Le Havre Normandy University is co-founder (with the University of Strasbourg) of the Unitwin Complex System Digital Campus UNESCO (List-unesco-networks ).

Notable people

Faculty
 Béatrice Galinon-Mélénec (born 1949) - semiotician.

Alumni
Ida Daussy (born 1969) - French born television personality in South Korea; also known by her Korean name Seo Hye-na
 Stéphanie Kerbarh (born 31 July 1975) - politician

Honorary degree recipients 
 James A. Yorke, Doctor Honoris Causa degree from le Havre university, June 2014.

See also

 List of public universities in France by academy
 History of Le Havre

References

Educational institutions established in 1985
Buildings and structures in Le Havre
Universities and colleges in Le Havre
1985 establishments in France